Hendrik Jan van Eikema Hommes (May 3, 1930, IJlst – September 3, 1984, Bussum) was a noted Dutch legal scholar and successor to Herman Dooyeweerd in the post of philosopher and judicial scholar at Vrije Universiteit, Amsterdam, Netherlands.

Van Eikema Hommes wrote an Introduction to the Philosophy of Dooyeweerd, along with numerous legal studies. He was elected a member of the Royal Netherlands Academy of Arts and Sciences in 1983.

Academic works
Major trends in the history of legal philosophy. Amsterdam: North Holland, 1979.
"Freedom and equality in constitutional and civil law." In: Equality and Freedom: International and Comparative Jurisprudence. Papers of the World Congress on Philosophy of Law and Social Philosophy. St Louis, 1975. Vol. III, 1977, pp. 1085–1094.

 "Legal Order and Legal Principles," in Symposia I (Memoria del X Congreso mundial ordinario de filosofía del derecho y filosofía social 5; Universidad nacional autónoma de México, 1981), pp. 43–56.

References

1930 births
1984 deaths
Members of the Royal Netherlands Academy of Arts and Sciences
People from Wymbritseradiel
Academic staff of Vrije Universiteit Amsterdam
20th-century Dutch philosophers